Minik Dahl Høegh (born 4 May 1985) is a Greenlandic handballer, currently playing for Amo Handboll and the Greenlandic national team.

Minik started playing handball at the age of 17. In 2008 he signed a contract with Danish side GOG.

At the 2012 Pan American Men's Handball Championship and 2016 Pan American Men's Handball Championship Minik Dahl Høegh became topscorer and was selected for the all-star team.

Privately he is in a relationship with the Greenlandic-Danish singer Julie Berthelsen. They have two children together, Casper Nanoq Dahl Høegh, Sia Star Dahl Høegh.

References

1985 births
Greenlandic male handball players
Greenlandic emigrants to Denmark
Living people